Elections to Cumnock and Doon Valley District Council were held on 7 May 1992, on the same day as the other Scottish local government elections. This was the final election to the district council which was abolished in 1995 along with Kilmarnock and Loudoun District Council and replaced by East Ayrshire Council following the implementation of the Local Government etc. (Scotland) Act 1994. The regional council, Strathclyde was also abolished and the new unitary authority took on its responsibilities.

The election was also the last to use the 10 wards created by the Initial Statutory Reviews of Electoral Arrangements in 1981 without alterations. Each ward elected one councillor using first-past-the-post voting.

Labour maintained control of the district council after winning all 10 seats although two were uncontested after only Labour stood a candidate. Despite the uncontested seats, Labour increased their vote share by 4.9% and took nearly two-thirds of the popular vote. The Social Democratic Party and Independent Labour, who both won one seat at the previous election in 1988, lost their only seats.

Results

Source:

Ward results

Cumnock East

Lugar, Logan and Muirkirk

Cumnock South and Old Cumnock

Cumnock West and Auchinleck

Catrine, Sorn and North Auchinleck

New Cumnock

Dalmellington

Patna and Dalrymple

Drongan, Ochiltree, Rankinston and Stair

Mauchline

References

Cumnock
Cumnock and Doon Valley District Council elections